The 2010–12 European Nations Cup Second Division is the third tier rugby union in Europe behind the Six Nations Championship and the 2010–12 European Nations Cup First Division.

The second division comprises four pools (2A, 2B, 2C, and 2D).  Teams within each division play each other in a home and away round robin schedule over a two-year period.

At the end of each season a champion is declared, but for relegation and promotion only the two years ranking are considered.

The first in the 2010–2012 ranking of each pool will be promoted while last place teams will be relegated.  Winners of pool 2A, will be promoted to division 1-pool B for the 2012–14 edition while the last place team in pool 2A will be relegated to pool 2B.  Likewise, winners of 2B will be promoted to 2A, last place in 2B will be relegated to 2C, winner of 2C will be promoted to 2B, last place of 2C will be relegated to 2D, winner of 2D will be promoted to 2C and last place of 2D will be relegated to 3; The winner of 3 replacing the relegated 2D team.  Additionally, there will be playoff matches between second place teams and fourth place teams between pools.  Winners of these playoffs will determine if additional promotions/relegation occur. There will no playoff between the fourth of 2D and the second of 3.

Division 2A

Season 2010–2011
 Table

 Matches

Season 2011–2012
 Table

Matches

Table 2010–12

Division 2B

Season 2010–11

 Table

 Matches

Season 2011–12

 Table

Table 2010–2012

Division 2C

Season 2010–11 
Table

Matches

Season 2011–12 
Table

Matches

Season 2010–12 
Table

Division 2D

Season 2010–11 
Table

Matches

Season 2011–12

Table 2010–12

Due to Armenia dropping out of the European Nations Cup, Finland was not relegated to Division 3.

Promotion/relegation playoffs

2A/2B

2B/2C

Slovenia chose to accept relegation to Division 2C and forfeited the match.

2C/2D

Due to Armenia dropping out of the European Nations Cup, both teams will play in Division 2C.

References

Division 2A
Division 2B
Division 2C
Division 2D

2010-12
2010–11 in European rugby union
2011–12 in European rugby union
European Nations Cup Second Division
European Nations Cup Second Division
European Nations Cup Second Division

fr:Championnat européen des nations de rugby à XV 2010-2012#Division 2A